South Washington Street Historic District may refer to:

South Washington Street Historic District (Clarkesville, Georgia), listed on the National Register of Historic Places in Habersham County, Georgia
South Washington Street Historic District (North Attleborough, Massachusetts), listed on the National Register of Historic Places in Bristol County, Massachusetts
South Washington Street Historic District (Watertown, Wisconsin), listed on the National Register of Historic Places in Jefferson County, Wisconsin

See also
Washington Street Historic District (disambiguation)